Lola James is an upcoming American independent drama film directed by Nicola Peltz and Bria Vinaite in their directorial debut, from a screenplay written by Peltz. The film stars Nicola Peltz and Virginia Madsen.

Cast
 Nicola Peltz as Lola James
 Virginia Madsen as Mona
 Richie Merritt as Malachi, Lola's boyfriend
 Trevor Long as Trick, Mona's boyfriend
 Raven Goodwin as Babina, Lola's best friend
 Luke David Blumm as Arlo, Lola's nine-year-old brother

Production
In March 2021, it was announced that Nicola Peltz would make her directorial debut co-directing a film that she wrote titled Lola James. The film would star Peltz and Virginia Madsen. During production, it was revealed that Richie Merritt, Trevor Long, Raven Goodwin, and Luke David Blumm were in the cast.

Principal photography began on March 1, 2021 and concluded on April 15, 2021, in Los Angeles, California.

References

External links
 

Upcoming films
American drama films
American independent films